Cleveland "Chiflán" Clark Steele (born July 14, 1919) is a former Negro league baseball player. He played for the New York Cubans from 1945 to 1948. His nickname, Chiflán, means "shifty".

References

External links
 and Seamheads

1919 births
Possibly living people
New York Cubans players
Cuban baseball players
People from Las Tunas (city)